Paul Goeminne (born 1888, date of death unknown) was a Belgian ice hockey player. He won the 1913 European title and finished third at the 1914 European Championships and fifth at the 1920 Summer Olympics.

References

External links
 

1888 births
Date of death unknown
Ice hockey players at the 1920 Summer Olympics
Olympic ice hockey players of Belgium
Sportspeople from Brussels
Belgian ice hockey forwards